Keachi Presbyterian Church is a historic Presbyterian church located on Louisiana Highway 5 in Keachi in DeSoto Parish in northwestern Louisiana.

It was built in 1858 in Greek Revival style and it was deemed to be "the finest" among merely seven country Greek Revival churches in the state of Louisiana, three of which happen to be in Keachi.

Its portico with four Doric columns was enclosed in renovations in the 1890s, and the building's cupola appears to have been added then as well.

The church was added to the National Register of Historic Places on June 30, 1988.

See also
National Register of Historic Places listings in DeSoto Parish, Louisiana

References

Presbyterian churches in Louisiana
Churches on the National Register of Historic Places in Louisiana
Greek Revival church buildings in Louisiana
Churches completed in 1858
Churches in DeSoto Parish, Louisiana
National Register of Historic Places in DeSoto Parish, Louisiana